Instrument is the eighth studio album by German band To Rococo Rot. It was released in July 2014 under City Slang Records.

Track list

References

2014 albums
To Rococo Rot albums